Kusumavati Channabasappa Shivalli is an Indian politician who is the current MLA from Kundgol constituency. She is a member of the Indian National Congress.

Political career 
She entered politics after the untimely death of her husband C. S. Shivalli. She was fielded by the Congress Working Committee as the party's candidate from Kundgol for the 23 May 2019 by elections in Karnataka. She won the election leading with 1601 votes.

References 

Kannada people
Living people
Indian National Congress politicians
People from Karnataka
People from Dharwad district
1971 births
Indian National Congress politicians from Karnataka